The women's shot put event at the 2006 Commonwealth Games was held on March 22. It was held in the Dawn McCluskey centre for athletics.

Results

References
Results

Shot
2006
2006 in women's athletics